Bangarwadi is a Marathi film directed by Amol Palekar. It is based on an eponymous novel written by Vyankatesh Madgulkar and published in 1955. It is the story of a young school teacher and his experiences in a small village of shepherds in the princely state of Aundh during the 1940s.

Plot
The story begins with a young school teacher, played by Chandrakant Kulkarni, walking alone towards a village called Bangarwadi, across a deserted landscape. When he reaches Bangarwadi, he finds that the school has shut down and that the people of the village are reluctant to send their children to school. With the support of the Karbhari (the village head), the  teacher convinces the villagers to send their children to school. He runs the school for the next few months and helps the illiterate and the needy in the village, which sometimes lands him into trouble. Soon, he convinces the villagers to set up a gymnasium through community participation. He invites the king of the state, Pant Pratinidhi for its inauguration. The sudden death of the village head leaves the village and the teacher shocked. Then comes prolonged drought. The teacher tries his best to get help from the government, writing frequent letters describing the graveness of situation, but he gets no response. Drought forces the people of Bangarwadi to abandon the village, leaving the school teacher alone and with no students.

Cast
 Chandrakant Kulkarni as the school teacher
 Chandrakant Mandare as Karbhari (the village head)
 Adhishree Atre as Anji
 Nandu Madhav as Ananda Ramoshi
 Sunil Ranade as Aayub
 Nagesh Bhonsle as Daddu Baltya
 Hiralal Jain as Kakabu
 Kishor Kadam as Rama
 Upendra Limaye as Sheku
 Ravi Kale

Awards
 National Award for the best Feature Film in Marathi, 1996
 Kalnirnaya Award Best Film, 1997
 Filmfare Award for Best Film and Direction, 1997
 Maharashtra state awards in five categories, 1996

Film festivals
Bangarwadi was screened at several international film festivals:
 Karlovy Vary International Film Festival, 1996
 Birmingham International Film Festival, 1996
 London Film Festival, the UK, 1996
 15th FAJR International Film Festival, Iran, 1997
 Cairo International Film Festival, Egypt, 1996
 Bogota International Film Festival, Colombia, 1996
 Sarajevo Film Festival, Prague 1996

References

External links
 
 title Bangarwadi review-New York Times
 

1995 films
1990s Marathi-language films
Films directed by Amol Palekar
Best Marathi Feature Film National Film Award winners